The Entombment is a glue-size painting on linen attributed to the Early Netherlandish painter Dieric Bouts. It shows a scene from the biblical entombment of Christ, and was probably completed between 1440 and 1455 as a wing panel for a large hinged polyptych altarpiece. The now-lost altarpiece is thought to have contained a central crucifixion scene flanked by four wing panel works half its height – two on either side – depicting scenes from the life of Christ. The smaller panels would have been paired in a format similar to Bouts's 1464–1468 Altarpiece of the Holy Sacrament. The larger work was probably commissioned for export to Italy, possibly to a Venetian patron whose identity is lost. The Entombment was first recorded in a mid-19th century Milan inventory and has been in the National Gallery, London, since its purchase on the gallery's behalf by Charles Lock Eastlake in 1861.

The painting is an austere but affecting portrayal of sorrow and grief. It shows four female and three male mourners grieving over the body of Christ. They are, from left to right, Nicodemus, Mary Salome, Mary of Clopas, Mary, the mother of Jesus, John the Evangelist, Mary Magdalene and Joseph of Arimathea.

It is one of the few surviving 15th-century paintings created using glue-size, an extremely fragile medium lacking durability. The Entombment is in relatively poor condition compared to panel paintings of similar age. Its colours are now far duller than when it was painted; they would, however, always have appeared as less intense and brilliant than those of comparable oil or tempera paintings on panel.  The painting is covered by accumulated layers of grey dirt and cannot be cleaned without damaging the surface and removing large amounts of pigment as its glue-size medium is water-soluble. A strip at the top has been less affected than the rest because it was protected by a frame.

Painting

Description
The Entombment shows Christ's body, wrapped in a white linen shroud and still wearing a crown of thorns, as it is lowered into a deep stone tomb. He is attended by seven mourners dressed in contemporary clothing. Among the group of mourners standing at Christ's side, the three female figures are shown with downcast eyes while the two men look directly at Christ; these gazes are reversed with the couple kneeling at his feet. The background contains a wide landscape with a winding pathway and a broad river before a more distant vista of trees and hills. Bouts is considered an innovative painter of landscapes, even in his portrait work where they are included as distant views seen through open windows. The vista in The Entombment is regarded as one of his finest, and is typically  composed of distant brown and green hills against a blue sky.

The Pharisee Nicodemus supports Christ as he is lowered, and can be identified by his similarity to Simon the Pharisee in another canvas attributed to Bouts, Christ in the House of Simon. The Virgin wears a white headdress and a dark blue dress with a yellowish mantle, and holds Christ's arm just above his wrist as if afraid to let go of her dead son. She is supported by John the Evangelist, who wears a red robe. Dressed in green robes, Mary Salome stands to the Virgin's left, wiping tears from her face with the fold of her white headdress. Mary of Clopas is behind them, holding a red cloth over her mouth, while the Magdalen is in the foreground at Christ's feet, dressed in a heavily folded cloak. The man in the brown–green tabard at the feet of Christ is probably Joseph of Arimathea, who, according to Gospel, brought Christ's body to Golgotha from Pontius Pilate.

The Entombment is painted on linen tightly woven with 20 to 22 vertical and between 19 and 22 horizontal threads per centimetre. The cloth is Z-spun (tightly spun) and tabby woven with flax perhaps combined with cotton. The cloth support is lined, unusually, with similar but more finely woven linen mounted on a wooden stretcher. Before the paint was applied, the linen was first mounted on a temporary stretcher and outlined with a brown border – now visible on the lower border – which was used as a guide to cut the picture down before framing. Glue-sizing consists of creating a distemper by mixing pigments in water and then using a glue-base derived from boiled animal skin and other tissues as a binder. The pigments were applied to a linen cloth, treated with the same glue sizing,  fixed in turn to its frame by glue.  The paint saturated the cloth,  often leaving an image on the reverse side, which was lined with an additional cloth.

Pigments bound in glue had an optical quality that rendered  them opaque in appearance and unusually vivid. Unlike oil, which makes chalk appear translucent, chalk mixed in glue is rendered as stark white. Similarly,  more expensive pigments assume brilliant opacity in a glue medium.  The whites are chalk in areas mixed with lead white, especially in the Magdalen's mantle and veil, Christ's shroud and the Virgin's veil. The artist used four blue pigments, an unusual number for paintings of the period, with indigo predominating.  As a plant-derived pigment, indigo it has a tendency to fade over time. Azurite and lead-white line the under-paint, while the landscape contains indigo mixed with lead-tin yellow. The sky and Nicodemus' collar are painted with lighter and less intense azurite, while the Virgin's dress is azurite mixed with ultramarine and smalt, a blue ground-glass pigment. The Entombment is one of the earliest Western pictorial works of art in which the use of smalt could be ascertained and its presence proves that the pigment was not invented during the sixteenth century, as had previously been believed.

The greens are mostly verdigris, although those predominant in the landscape are mostly blends of blue and yellow pigments, and the green of the cloth worn by Mary Salome is malachite mixed with yellow lake. The browns are blends of reds and blacks. John's red robe is composed from cinnabar and vermilion made from rubia and insect dyes. Some of the reds are mixed with earth colours not susceptible to the effects of light, and have thus survived close to their original appearance. The black pigments are generally bone blacks but in places from charcoal. The blacks are mixed with chalk in areas, producing a red to brownish 'earthy' appearance.

The cloth support is visible in areas where the paint was thinly applied. Rusty nail holes can be seen in the lower border and across the top of the picture in an area of sky that was initially covered by frame. They indicate that the woodworking was positioned much lower than Bouts had intended; generally works painted on commission were placed by professional joiners who worked independently of the painter. The low placing of the frame however protected the underlying colours over the centuries from light; they are preserved as first laid down. The panel was originally attached to its frame by pegs and nails; the nails would have been used to attach the linen to the underlying wooden frame.

Condition
Painting on linen cloth using glue size as a binder was at the time a relatively inexpensive alternative to oil, and a large number of works were produced in the 15th century. Glue size does not saturate the pigments as much as oil, allowing them to show as matt and opaque, giving – especially with reds and blues – an intense appearance when applied to cloth. Cloth is fragile and perishes easily, and this work is one of the best preserved of the few surviving examples of the technique from the period; the majority extant today were executed on wood using oil or egg tempera. Curtains or glass were often used to protect glue-sized works.

The colours would have first appeared bright and crisp, but over five-and-a-half centuries the painting has acquired layers of grey dirt which darken the tone and render the colours faint and pallid. Normally these layers of dirt would be removed by restorers, but given the delicate and fragile nature of a work painted in a water-soluble medium, it is impossible to do so without removing large amounts of pigment. The colours as they appear today have faded from their original hues. The Virgin's mantle is now brown but would have been painted as blue. Joseph's tabard, once blue, now appears as green. The original indigos of the landscape are lost, while the azurite in Nicodemus's collar has darkened.

It is possible to see the degree to which the technique allowed Bouts, in the words of art historian Susan Jones, to "[achieve such] sophistication ... to create both fine linear detail and subtle tonal transitions." Jones notes that the sky would have appeared with the same clear and pale blue that is still intact in a narrow strip along the top of the work, which has been protected from light and dirt by a frame. In its current condition the muted landscape appears to echo the sorrow of the mourning figures.

X-ray analysis shows that there were a few preparatory drawings made with chalk before the paint was applied. This is left exposed in some areas, most noticeably in the Virgin's veil and mantle and in Christ's shroud. Infrared photography reveals little underdrawing but indicates that the canvas underwent several changes before completion; Mary Salome was repositioned slightly to the left, the sizes of Nicodemus' arm and shoulder were reduced, and the Magdalen's face was painted over the Virgin's mantle.

The cloth on which the work was painted had been lined with a more finely woven piece of linen and restretched, probably by the same person who stretched and lined the other works identified with the larger altarpiece. It was placed under glass, probably in the early 19th century and certainly before its acquisition by the National Gallery (Eastlake noted that it was under glass in 1858). The piece was evidently sent rolled and unframed to its patron. The brown border painted along the four sides indicates where the frame should be positioned when it is added to its final support. The row of rust-stained nail holes running along the top of the cloth is evidence that the frame was eventually positioned within the pictorial field, at a point far lower than Bouts had intended. This low framing protected a portion of the canvas from deterioration and allows us to see some of the colours as they would have originally appeared.

Polyptych

Charles Eastlake saw the work in 1858 and again in 1860 during visits to Milan to purchase Northern Renaissance art on behalf of the National Gallery. He also viewed three companion pieces but was told they were not on sale.  His notes described each of these other works, which he titled: Annunciation (now in the J. Paul Getty Museum), Adoration of the Kings (now in a private collection in Germany) and Presentation (or Resurrection; now in the Norton Simon Museum, Pasadena, California). These works are the same size as The Entombment, have similar colouring and pigmentation and are painted using the same glue-size technique, but are not as well preserved. It is probable that all were re-lined and stretched at the same time by the same restorer, indicating that they were kept together until shortly before The Entombment was acquired by the National Gallery.

Art historian Robert Koch remarked in 1988 on the similarity of provenance, material, technique, tone and colour of the four works described by Eastlake. He proposed that they were intended as wings of a five-part polyptych altarpiece. Based on the format of Bouts's 1464–1468 Altarpiece of the Holy Sacrament, whose four wing panels are the same length as The Entombment, he believes the altarpiece would have comprised a large central panel with four works half its length and width positioned two at either side. His speculative reconstruction places The Entombment on the upper right-hand wing, above the Adoration.

The large centre canvas has not been positively identified. However both Koch and Campbell believe that a damaged Crucifixion, now in the Royal Museums of Fine Arts of Belgium, Brussels, was probably the centrepiece. Its size (181 × 153.5 cm) is exactly double that of the four wing panels. Campbell believes that the altarpiece was painted on commission for export, most likely to Venice. The altarpiece was probably broken up as large religious works had fallen out of fashion by the 17th century, and would have had more value as single panels.

Provenance and attribution
Bouts did not inscribe any of his paintings, which makes attribution and dating difficult. His developing skill with perspective and unified vanishing points is used by art historians to date his works from the period. Although its colourisation is among the best of his work, the perspective is clumsy in areas, thus the painting can be assumed to date no later than 1460. Bouts often quoted visual passages from artists and paintings that influenced his work, so the influences are well established and datable.  Along with the companion Resurrection, British art historian Martin Davies believes the work shows influences from Rogier van der Weyden's Descent (c. 1435) and Miraflores Altarpiece (1440s), which places it after 1440. Robert Koch dates it to between 1450 and 1455.

During a period of aggressive acquisition intended to establish the international prestige of Britain's collection, it was acquired for the National Gallery in 1860 in Milan from the Guicciardi family by Charles Lock Eastlake for just over £120, along with a number of other Netherlandish works. Eastlake's notes mention that the works were "originally in the possession of the Foscari family". The Foscaris were a wealthy Venetian family which included Francesco Foscari who was Doge of Venice at the time the work was painted; the dramatic story of him and his son is told in Lord Byron's play The Two Foscari, and Verdi's opera I due Foscari. There is no documentary evidence to substantiate the claim that the painting came from the Foscari  collection, and some art historians believe that representatives of the Guicciardis invented this provenance to impress Eastlake. Lorne Campbell considers the provenance "probable", noting that a descendant, Ferigo Foscari (1732–1811), an ambassador to Saint Petersburg, squandered his fortune and may have been forced into selling pictures belonging to the family. Campbell speculates that the painting was produced on commission for export to Venice, noting that unrolled linen would have been easier to transport than canvas, and that the row of holes just below the upper border could be explained if it had been stretched, mounted and framed by someone other than Bouts or a member of his workshop.

The companion pieces in the Guicciardi collection (Annunciation, Adoration of the Kings, and Resurrection) were similar works in glue-size, though of lesser quality; Eastlake's notebooks mention that they were "not so good (not so well preserved)". Their style and size are similar to The Entombment, suggesting that they were probably pieces that would have formed part of the larger polyptych. The Entombment was attributed to Lucas van Leyden at the time, though Eastlake thought that, given its emotional power, it might be a van der Weyden. Bouts studied under van der Weyden, and was strongly influenced by his work. Davies proposed in 1953 that the figuration and pose in The Entombment may have been informed by a small grisaille relief in the arch of the central panel of van der Weyden's Miraflores Altarpiece.

The painting arrived in London from Milan in 1861, but was not attributed to Bouts until 1911. Two known copies exist: an unsophisticated panel sold in Munich to a private collector in 1934, and an oak panel attributed to a follower  which is in Kreuzlingen, Switzerland.

The influence of Netherlandish painting spread to central Europe in the late 15th century, and many copies or designs based on the work of the Netherlandish masters were produced. The influence of Bouts's Entombment can be seen in the German artist Martin Schongauer's c. 1480  engraving of the same name; it not only has compositional similarity but echoes Bouts's use of emotive gesture, posture and expression.

References

Notes

Sources

 Borchert, Till-Holger. "Collecting Early Netherlandish Paintings in Europe and the United States". in Ridderbos, Bernhard, Van Buren, Anne, Van Veen, Henk (eds). Early Netherlandish Paintings: Rediscovery, Reception and Research. Amsterdam: Amsterdam University Press, 2005 
 Campbell, Lorne. The Fifteenth Century Netherlandish Paintings. National Gallery, 1998. 
 Davies, Martin. Primitifs flamands. I, Corpus de la peinture des anciens Pays-Bas méridionaux au quinzième siècle: The National Gallery, London.  De Sikkel, Volume 1, 1953
 Dunkerton, Jill. Giotto to Dürer: early Renaissance painting in The National Gallery. New Haven: Yale University Press, 1991 
 Jones, Susan Frances. Van Eyck to Gossaert. National Gallery, 2011. 
 Koch, Robert. "The Getty 'Annunciation' by Dieric Bouts". The Burlington Magazine, Volume 130, July 1988
 Leonard, Mark, et al. "Dieric Bouts's 'Annunciation'. Materials and Techniques: A Summary". The Burlington Magazine, Volume 130, July 1988
 Spronk, Ron. "More than Meets the Eye: An Introduction to Technical Examination of Early Netherlandish Paintings at the Fogg Art Museum". Harvard University Art Museums Bulletin, Volume 5, Autumn 1996

Further reading

 Bomford, David; Roy, Ashok; Smith, Alistair. "The Techniques of Dieric Bouts: Two Paintings Contrasted". The National Gallery Technical Bulletin. Volume 10, No 1, January 1986. 39–57
 Eastlake, Charles; Avery-Quash, Susanna (ed). The travel notebooks of Sir Charles Eastlake. Wakefield, West Yorkshire: Walpole Society, 2011.

External links
 Reproduction with colours extensively adjusted to discern the original appearance

1450s paintings
Collections of the National Gallery, London
Paintings by Dieric Bouts
Bouts
Paintings of the Virgin Mary
Paintings depicting Mary Magdalene
Joseph of Arimathea
Nicodemus